Benjamin John Saunders (born 5 August 1977 in Plymouth) is an English polar explorer, endurance athlete, and motivational speaker. He led the first return journey to the South Pole on foot via Shackleton and Scott's route in 2013–14, and skied solo to the North Pole in 2004. Saunders has skied more than 3,700 miles (6,000 km) on polar expeditions since 2001. He holds the record for the longest human-powered polar journey in history (2,888 km) and for the longest solo Arctic journey by a Briton (1,032 km).

Biography

The elder of two boys, Saunders grew up in Devon and Kent, was educated at the Royal Military Academy Sandhurst, and worked as an instructor at the John Ridgway School of Adventure. He is a Fellow of the Royal Geographical Society, an Ambassador for the Prince's Trust, a Patron of British Exploring, a supporter of The Duke of Edinburgh's Award and the Orchid Cancer Appeal, a past Honorary Vice-President of the Geographical Association, and an honorary member of the Cordon Rouge Club. In July 2016 Saunders was awarded an Honorary Fellowship by the University of Northampton.

Saunders has contributed to publications including Worldchanging: A User's Guide for the 21st Century and 'The Middle of Nowhere''' published by Lonely Planet. He also spoke at the 2005 and 2014 main stage TED conferences.

Expeditions

North Pole
Saunders first attempted to reach the North Pole in 2001 on a two-man unsupported expedition led by Pen Hadow that started from the Arctic Cape in Siberia, Russia. The pair were unsuccessful in attaining the Pole but reached a point close to 87° North, after 59 days on the Arctic Ocean.

In April 2003, Saunders completed a 240 km solo round-trip to the North Pole from the temporary Russian ice station, Barneo.

In spring 2004, he set out to make a solo and unsupported crossing of the Arctic Ocean on foot, following a planned route from the Arctic Cape to Ward Hunt Island, Canada, via the North Pole. Saunders was dropped off by a Russian Mil Mi-8 helicopter on 5 March 2004, reached the North Pole on 11 May 2004, and was picked up on the Canadian side of the Arctic Ocean by a Kenn Borek Air Twin Otter ski plane on 14 May 2004.

Saunders' claim to have reached the North Pole solo in 2004 is disputed by ExplorersWeb, a website maintained by explorers Thomas and Tina Sjögren, who consider only expeditions that begin their journey on land to be valid. His 2004 expedition started 70 km north of Siberia's Cape Arktichevsky, with his online journal reporting 50 km of open water north of the Russian coastline that prevented him starting from land. ExplorersWeb listed Saunders' 2004 journey to the North Pole as a "partial expedition" on their database of expedition records.

In 2004, Australian explorer Eric Philips argued that this categorization of expeditions may have been a factor in the death of Finnish explorer Dominick Arduin, who died at the Arctic Cape in March 2004: "I can't help but think that this tragedy permeated as a result of the pressure placed on adventurers to have their expeditions regarded as unsupported. Again, Explorers Web and others are placing undue pressure on the adventuring community by categorizing expeditions on their achievements... we should not be pressured into feeling that our efforts fall short of somebody else's parameters."

On 27 March 2008, Saunders set out from Ward Hunt Island, Canada, with the aim of setting a speed record. The current record, 36 days 22 hours, was set in 2005 by a team guided by Canadian Matty McNair using dog sleds and numerous air-drops of food. In contrast, Saunders set out solo, unsupported, and on foot; he was halted after eight days, on 4 April 2008, due to a broken ski binding.

A second speed record attempt in March 2010 was unable to start due to a three-week period of adverse weather conditions on the far north of Canada's Ellesmere Island.

 South Pole 

Between October 2013 and February 2014, Saunders and Tarka L'Herpiniere made the first return journey to the South Pole from Ross Island on the same route attempted by Sir Ernest Shackleton on the Nimrod Expedition, and by Robert Falcon Scott on the Terra Nova Expedition. At 1,795 miles (2,888 km) the Scott Expedition is the longest human-powered polar journey in history. Saunders and L'Herpiniere set out from Ross Island on 26 October 2013, reached the South Pole on 26 December 2013 and finished their expedition at Ross Island again on 7 February 2014. The journey was not unsupported, since some supplies had to be delivered by air on their return journey.

Robert Swan OBE and Falcon Scott (Captain Scott's grandson) were patrons of the expedition.

Publications

See also
 Ed Stafford, British adventurer
 Bruce Parry, British adventurer
 Børge Ousland, Norwegian explorer
 Henry Cookson, British adventurer
 Ranulph Fiennes, British adventurer

References

External links
 Ben Saunders' website
 The Scott Expedition website
 
 "Why did I ski to the North Pole?" (TED2005)
 "Why bother leaving the house?" (TEDSalon London Fall 2012)
 "To the South Pole and back – the hardest 105 days of my life" (TED2014)
 This Much I Know by Jane Oddy, The Observer, 29 February 2004
 New York Times article on Ben Saunders
 Recording of Ben Saunders' speech to PopTech conference in Maine
 Terra Cognita by Joanne Ramos, Intelligent Life, December 2007
 Ben Saunders by Andy Bull, Guardian'', March 2008

1977 births
Living people
English explorers
Explorers of the Arctic
English bloggers
English motivational speakers
People from Plymouth, Devon
English polar explorers
Graduates of the Royal Military Academy Sandhurst
British male bloggers